Nezâ Selbuz (born January 2, 1967) is a Turkish-German actress.

Filmography

References

External links

1967 births
Living people
German people of Turkish descent
German film actresses
German television actresses